Zəhmətabad (known as Novomikhaylovka until 1991) is a village and municipality in the Bilasuvar Rayon of Azerbaijan.  It has a population of 3,006.

References 

Populated places in Bilasuvar District